The Men's 400 metre freestyle S9 event at the 2020 Paralympic Games took place on 25 August 2021, at the Tokyo Aquatics Centre.

Records

Heats
The swimmers with the top 8 times, regardless of heat, advanced to the final.

Final

See also
 Swimming at the 2016 Summer Paralympics – Men's 400 metre freestyle S9

References

Swimming at the 2020 Summer Paralympics